The Inner Mongolia Yitai Coal Company is an Ordos City-based coal company founded in 1997. The company works in the mining, production, transport, and sale of coal and coal-based products in Inner Mongolia and China. It has the seventh largest reserve of coal in the world measured by potential carbon emissions.

References

External links

The Inner Mongolia Yitai Coal Company Ltd website

Companies established in 1997
Coal companies of China
Companies based in Inner Mongolia
1997 establishments in China